"Two Wrongs" is the lead single from Haitian rapper Wyclef Jean's third studio album, Masquerade. The song, released in the United States on 13 May 2002, features Claudette Ortiz of American hip hop group City High. The single reached number one in New Zealand, number five in Australia, and number 14 in the United Kingdom. In the United States, it reached number 28 on the Billboard Hot 100 and number 11 on the Billboard Hot R&B/Hip-Hop Singles & Tracks chart. "Two Wrongs" is certified platinum in both Australia and New Zealand.

Track listings

US CD single 
 "Two Wrongs" (album version) – 3:50
 "Two Wrongs" (instrumental) – 3:50

US 12-inch single 
A1. "Two Wrongs" (album version) – 3:50
A2. "Two Wrongs" (instrumental) – 3:50
A3. "Two Wrongs" (a cappella) – 3:45
B1. "Masquerade" (clean version) – 4:01
B2. "Masquerade" (instrumental) – 4:01

UK CD single 
 "Two Wrongs" (album version) – 3:50
 "Africa" – 6:46
 "PJ's" (main) – 3:53
 "Two Wrongs" (video version)

European CD single 
 "Two Wrongs" (album version) – 3:50
 "Africa" (album version) – 6:46

European 12-inch single 
A1. "Two Wrongs" (album version) – 3:50
A2. "Ghetto Racine" (PJ's Creole mix) – 5:27
B1. "PJ's" (main) – 3:53
B2. "Two Wrongs" (instrumental) – 3:50

European maxi-CD single 
 "Two Wrongs" (album version) – 3:50
 "Africa" (album version) – 6:46
 "PJ's" (main) – 3:53
 "Ghetto Racine" (PJ's Creole mix) – 5:27
 "Two Wrongs" (video version)

Australian CD single 
 "Two Wrongs" (album version) – 3:50
 "PJ's" – 3:53
 "911" (live version) – 4:23
 "No Woman, No Cry" (by Fugees) – 5:46
 "Perfect Gentleman" – 4:09

Charts

Weekly charts

Year-end charts

Certifications

Release history

References

2002 singles
2002 songs
Number-one singles in New Zealand
Song recordings produced by Jerry Duplessis
Song recordings produced by Wyclef Jean
Songs written by Jerry Duplessis
Songs written by Wyclef Jean
Wyclef Jean songs